The mesosphere is the third layer of the atmosphere, directly above the stratosphere and directly below the thermosphere. In the mesosphere, temperature decreases as altitude increases. This characteristic is used to define its limits: it begins at the top of the stratosphere (sometimes called the stratopause), and ends at the mesopause, which is the coldest part of Earth's atmosphere, with temperatures below .

This is the turbopause, below which different chemical species are well-mixed due to turbulent eddies. Above this level the atmosphere becomes non-uniform because the scale heights of different chemical species differ according to their molecular masses.

The term near space is also sometimes used to refer to altitudes within the mesosphere. This term does not have a technical definition, but typically refers to the region roughly between the Armstrong limit (about 62,000 ft or 19 km, above which humans require a pressure suit in order to survive) and the Kármán line (where astrodynamics must take over from aerodynamics in order to achieve flight); or, by another definition, to the space between the highest altitude commercial airliners fly at (about 40,000 ft (12.2 km)) and the lowest perigee of satellites being able to orbit the Earth (about 45 mi (73 km)). Some sources distinguish between the terms "near space" and "upper atmosphere", so that only the layers closest to the Kármán line are described as "near space".

Temperature
Within the mesosphere, temperature decreases with increasing height, due to decreasing absorption of solar radiation by the rarefied atmosphere and increasing cooling by CO2 radiative emission. The top of the mesosphere, called the mesopause, is the coldest part of Earth's atmosphere.

Dynamic features

The main most important features in this region are strong zonal (East-West) winds, atmospheric tides, internal atmospheric gravity waves (commonly called "gravity waves"), and planetary waves. Most of these tides and waves start in the troposphere and lower stratosphere, and propagate to the mesosphere. In the mesosphere, gravity-wave amplitudes can become so large that the waves become unstable and dissipate. This dissipation deposits momentum into the mesosphere and largely drives global circulation.

Noctilucent clouds are located in the mesosphere. The upper mesosphere is also the region of the ionosphere known as the D layer, which is only present during the day when some ionization occurs with nitric oxide being ionized by Lyman series-alpha hydrogen radiation. The ionization is so weak that when night falls, and the source of ionization is removed, the free electron and ion form back into a neutral molecule.

Made of unbound, non-ionized atoms of sodium, the sodium layer radiates weakly to contribute to the airglow. The sodium has an average concentration of 400,000 atoms per cubic centimetre. This band is regularly replenished by sodium sublimating from incoming meteors. Astronomers have begun utilizing this sodium band to create "guide stars" as part of the adaptive optical correction process used to produce ultra-sharp ground-based observations. Other metal layers, e.g. iron and potassium, exist in the upper mesosphere/lower thermosphere region as well.

Beginning in October 2018, a distinct type of aurora has been identified, originating in the mesosphere. Often referred to as 'dunes' due to their resemblance to sandy ripples on a beach, the green undulating lights extend toward the equator. Since auroras are caused by ultra-high-speed solar particles interacting with atmospheric molecules, the green color of these dunes has tentatively been explained by the interaction of those solar particles with oxygen molecules. The dunes therefore occur where mesospheric oxygen is more concentrated.

Millions of meteors enter the Earth's atmosphere, averaging 40,000 tons per year. The ablated material, called meteoric smoke, is thought to serve as condensation nuclei for noctilucent clouds.

Exploration
Meanwhile, the mesosphere is below the minimum altitude for orbital spacecraft due to high atmospheric drag. It has only been accessed through the use of sounding rockets, which are only capable of taking mesospheric measurements for a few minutes per mission. As a result, it is the least-understood part of the atmosphere, resulting in the humorous moniker ignorosphere. The presence of red sprites and blue jets (electrical discharges or lightning within the lower mesosphere), noctilucent clouds, and density shears within this poorly understood layer are of current scientific interest.

On February 1, 2003,  broke up on reentry at about  altitude, in the lower mesosphere, killing all seven crew members.

Phenomena in mesosphere and near space

 Airglow
 Atmospheric tides
 Ionosphere
 Meteors
 Noctilucent clouds
 Polar aurora
 Sprite (lightning)
 Upper atmospheric lightning (Transient luminous event)

See also
 Aeronomy
 Amateur radio high-altitude ballooning
 Geospace
 High altitude

References

External links
 Description with links to other atmospheric topics
 Students And Teachers In Near Space 
 Near Space Systems
 Space Data Corporation
 The B.H.A.L.D.I. Project

Atmosphere
Atmosphere of Earth